The 1998 Scottish Cup Final was played on 16 May 1998 at Celtic Park in Glasgow and was the final of the 113th Scottish Cup. Heart of Midlothian and Rangers contested the match which Hearts won 2–1, thanks to Colin Cameron's early penalty and Stephane Adam's goal.

The match was also notable as Ally McCoist's last game for Rangers; he went on to score their goal after coming on as a substitute. It was the end of an era for one of the Glasgow club's most successful squads, who had won a record-equalling nine consecutive league titles but finished the 1997–98 season empty-handed, losing the cup final a week after their run of championships was ended by arch-rivals Celtic; in addition to McCoist, it was the last Rangers appearance for a number of their older players including Goram, McCall, Durrant, Gough and Laudrup and the manager Walter Smith, although several would return to the club in another capacity in the years to follow.

There was an element of revenge for Hearts in the victory, as they had recently lost to Rangers in both the 1996 Scottish Cup Final and the 1996 Scottish League Cup Final. John Robertson was an unused substitute in the match, which was his last involvement as a player with the club.

Match details

References

1998
Cup Final
Scottish Cup Final 1998
Scottish Cup Final 1998
20th century in Glasgow